Juncus marginatus is a species of flowering plant, it is a type of rush with the common names of margined rush and grass-leaf rush.

Description
Juncus marginatus is a grass-like, herbaceous, short-lived perennial growing from short rhizomes. Plants produce dense tufts or clumps growing 30-130 cm tall. The plants are sometimes rhizomatous. The leaf blades are flat. The flowers are grouped together into a terminal inflorescence called a glomerulus. Each flower has three stamens and three sharply acute sepals that are reddish-brown in color. The plump and ribbed seeds are produced in a rounded and beakless capsule. The small yellow to light brown seeds are spindle-shaped, and around 0.5mm in length and lack a tail but have sharp points on either end (apiculate). The diploid chromosome count is 38.

Distribution and habitat
Juncus marginatus grows in North America in the Eastern and Southeastern US, ranging to Texas and South Dakota. It is also found  Ontario Canada, California, Colorado, New Mexico, Oregon,  New Mexico, the West Indies (Cuba), and Central America; where is found growing in moist to wet bogs, on shorelines, in marshes and ditches - with sandy, peaty, or clayey soils. One historic population existed in Minnesota until 1999 when other small populations were found in Anoka County; because of its rarity it was listed as an endangered specie in the state. In Minnesota the species is found growing in shallow wetlands/prairies of the Anoka Sand Plain where the normally dry sandy ground dips below the water table.

References

marginatus